Darlia is a British rock band from Blackpool. Formed in 2013, the band  have so far released various EPs and a mini-album, Petals.

History

The band was formed in 2013 in Blackpool by former schoolmates Nathan Day and Jack Bentham, along with Dave Williams. They signed with B-Unique recordings and released three EPs between 2013 and 2015. Petals, an eight track mini-album, was released in 2015, charting at number 79 in the UK. The band have toured supporting Gerard Way, Nothing But Thieves and The Wombats, played Glastonbury Festival and Reading Festival, as well as being part of the NME Awards Tour 2015. Their first full LP was expected to be released in 2016.  In 2017 front-man Nathan Day released a satirical NME article that suggested the band had been taking a break.

Band members
Nathan Day – vocals, guitar (2013–present)
Dave "Davey" Williams – bass guitar, backing vocals (2013–present)
Micko Larkin - guitar, backing vocals (2017–present)
Greg "Greggles" Bishop - drums, backing vocals (2017–present)

Former members
Jack Bentham – drums, backing vocals (2013-2017)

Discography

Albums

Extended plays/Singles EP

List of songs

Singles

Queen Of Hearts (2013)
Stars Are Aligned (2014)
Candyman (2014)
Dear Diary (2014)
I've Never Been To Ohio (2015)
Ballad of Black & White (2017)
Beat Me Up (2017)
Pandemonium (2019)

Side projects

Nathan Day

EPs
 We Come In Pieces (2021)

Singles
 Vertigo (2019) [non-album single]
 Catch Some Zee's (2019) [non-album single]
 She Came Down From The Stars (2021)
 Fade Like You (2021)
 Friends (2021)

References

External links
Official website
YouTube first channel (VEVO)
YouTube second channel

English rock music groups
Musical groups from Lancashire
Ignition Records artists